Sachpekidis is a surname. Notable people with the surname include:
 Filip Sachpekidis (born 1997), Swedish footballer
 Mischell Miljević-Sachpekidis (born 1989), Swedish-Serb footballer